

Appointed governors
Daigo Tadamasa 1868
Gotō Shōjirō 1868-1870
Kimimasa Yuri 1870
Yotsutsuji Nishi 1870-1872
Norobu Watanabe 1872-1880
Tateno Tsuyoshi 1880-1889
Nishimura Sutezō 1889-1891
Yamada Nobumichi 1891-1895
Utsumi Tadakatsu 1895-1897
Tokito Konkyo 1897-1898
Mamoru Okimorikata 1898
Yoshihara Saburo 1898
Tadashini Kikuchi 1898-1902
Chikaaki Takasaki 1902-1911
Marques Okubo Toshi Takeshi 1912-1917
Harumichi Tanabe 1927-1928
Yūichirō Chikaraishi 1928-1929
Saito Munenori 1931-1932
Shinobu Agata 1932-1935
Minabe Choji 1941-1943

Elected governors
Bunzo Akama 1947-1959
Gisen Sato 1959-1971
Ryōichi Kuroda 1971-1979
Kazuo Nakagawa 1991-1995
Knock Yokoyama 1995-1999
Fusae Ohta 2000-2008
Tōru Hashimoto 2008-2011
Ichirō Matsui 2011-2011
Hirofumi Yoshimura 2019-present

 
Osaka Prefecture